Elche de la Sierra is a municipality in Albacete, Castile-La Mancha, Spain.  This province belongs to the autonomous community of Castilla-La Mancha. It had a population of 3,944  at the beginning of 2010 as reported by the country's National Statistics Institute.

Climate

Notable people
 Juan Belencoso, footballer

See also
 List of municipalities in Albacete
 Church of Santa Quiteria

References

Municipalities of the Province of Albacete